The St. Clair River is a  river in central North America which flows from Lake Huron into Lake St. Clair, forming part of the international boundary between Canada and the United States and between the Canadian province of Ontario and the U.S. state of Michigan.  The river is a significant component in the Great Lakes Waterway, whose shipping channels permit cargo vessels to travel between the upper and lower Great Lakes.

Location
The river, which some consider a strait, flows in a southerly direction, connecting the southern end of Lake Huron to the northern end of Lake St. Clair. It branches into several channels near its mouth at Lake St. Clair, creating a broad delta region known as the St. Clair Flats. Like a strait, the river serves as a narrow strip of water which connects two larger bodies of water.

Size
This takes into account the combined drainage areas of Lakes Huron, Michigan, and Superior.

History
In the 18th century, French voyageurs and coureurs des bois travelled on the river to trade with the Ojibwa and other regional Native Americans and transport furs in canoes to major posts of French and British traders, including Fort Detroit, built in 1701 downriver below Lake St. Clair. European demand for American furs, especially beaver, was high until the 1830s.

During the mid-19th century and later, wooden ships built at Port Huron and Marine City, Michigan, carried immigrants up the river and west through the upper Great Lakes on their way to new homes in the American West. Lumber harvested on The Thumb of Michigan was shipped downriver as log rafts to Detroit for processing and export.

In the early 20th century, lake steamers carried passengers and traveled among the small towns along the St. Clair and Detroit rivers, and around the Great Lakes. During the 20th century, lake freighters, increasingly made of steel, traveled throughout the Great Lakes, transporting commodities such as iron ore from the Mesabi Range, copper, and grain, all products of settlers' labor. Iron was taken to Ashtabula, Ohio and other industrial cities for processing and steel manufacture, and grain was often shipped through to major eastern markets such as Cleveland and New York City.

Watersheds

The St. Clair River and its Lambton County tributaries in Ontario contribute  to the watershed. This figure does not include the Sydenham River watershed. In Michigan, the Black, Pine, and Belle rivers drain  in Lapeer, Macomb, Sanilac, and St. Clair counties; the watersheds around Bunce Creek and Marine City are relatively small.

Islands

 Stag Island lies between Corunna, Ontario and Marysville, Michigan.
 Fawn Island is near Port Lambton, Ontario and Marine City, Michigan.
 Walpole, Seaway, Bassett, Squirrel, Pottowatamie, St. Anne, Dickinson, Russell and Harsens islands are located in the delta where the St. Clair River flows into Lake St. Clair near Algonac, Michigan. These islands are part of the "St. Clair Flats", the only major river delta in the Great Lakes. Six of the islands in this delta are unceded territory that are part of the Walpole Island First Nations, whose members include Ojibwe (Anishinaabe), Potowatomi, and Odawa peoples. They call this delta area Bkejwanong, meaning "where the waters divide".

Land usage
Most of the watershed away from the river in Ontario and Michigan is used for agriculture. There were numerous sugar beet farms in the flatlands, and an annual beet market was held in Marine City, Michigan, for years at harvest time. Many of the 19th-century English immigrants to this area came from Lincolnshire, England, where sugar beets were a major commodity crop in the 19th and 20th centuries.

A few forest and wetland areas have survived. Their area has declined significantly since European-American  settlement, clearing, and development of cultivated fields for various agricultural crops.

Much of the shoreline on both sides of the St. Clair River is urbanized and extensively industrialized. Intensive development has occurred in and near the adjacent cities of Port Huron, Michigan and Sarnia, Ontario, at the northern end of the river. The most dense concentration of industry, including a large petrochemical complex, lies along the Ontario shore south of Sarnia. Historically Sarnia was founded as a fur trading post.

Several communities along the St. Clair rely on the river as their primary source of drinking water. About one-third to one-half of the residents of Michigan receive their water from the St. Clair/Detroit River waterway.  Industries including petroleum refineries, chemical manufacturers, paper mills, salt producers, and electric power plants also need high-quality water for their operations. Since the late 20th century and passage of environmental laws to protect air and water quality, there have been occasional incidents when some of these industries have illegally contaminated river waters after discharging pollutants. Major clean-up activities were required.

Land habitat

Land areas of the St. Clair River shoreline and flats consist of two biological zones: upland and transitional, both of which are normally above the water table, but which may be flooded periodically.

The upland forests consist of deciduous species, many of which are near their northern climatic limit. Most pre-European settlement trees have been cleared for agriculture, industry, or urbanization. Remaining forest stands, such as oak savannas as well as lakeplain prairies, are found along the southern reaches of the river, particularly on the islands of the St. Clair River Delta and on the Michigan shore in Algonac State Park.

Transitional species are abundant in the low-lying regions, categorized as shrub ecotones, wet meadows, sedge marshes, and island shorelines and beaches. This habitat is home to water and land mammals, including humans, as well as songbirds, waterfowl, insects, pollinators, reptiles, and amphibians.

Water habitat

The aquatic habitat of the St. Clair River ranges from deep and fast near the Blue Water Bridge to shallow and slow in the lower river near its discharge point into Lake St. Clair.

Each area provides a unique habitat for aquatic life:
 macrophytes (visible marine plants),
 benthic macroinvertebrates (organisms that live at the bottom of a lake or stream),
 phytoplankton and zooplankton (floating plants and animals),
 emergent vegetation (plants seen above the water surface),
 fish (from minnows to large sport fish).

Area of concern

The St. Clair River is a binational Area of Concern (AOC) that borders both the United States and Canada. An AOC is an area within the Great Lakes, that has suffered from environmental destruction. The St. Clair River has been considered an AOC because conventional pollutants such as bacteria, heavy metals, toxic organics, contaminated sediment, fish consumption advisories, impacted animal and plant life, and beach closings.

The United States found that 10 out of 14 of the beneficial use impairments (BUI) were impaired, which would lead to a $21 million investment from the Great Lakes Restoration Initiative. After several habitat projects, only two impairments exists: the Restrictions on Fish and Wildlife Consumption and the Restrictions on Drinking Water Consumption or Taste and Odor Problems.

Beneficial use impairments 
A beneficial use impairment is a change within the physical, biological, and chemical consistency that causes significant environmental degradation. The St. Clair River has undergone several projects and clean up to remove the BUIs that affected the area. There is currently only 2 BUIs left on the St. Clair River, and once those 2 are removed, the river might go through the delisting process.

List of beneficial use impairments that has impacted the St. Clair River 

 Restrictions on fish and wildlife consumption
 Restrictions on drinking water consumption, or taste and odor
 Tainting of fish and wildlife flavor – REMOVED 2010
 Restriction on dredging activities – REMOVED 2011
 Added costs to agriculture or industry – REMOVED 2012
 Degradation of aesthetics – REMOVED 2012
 Degradation of benthos – REMOVED 2015
 Beach closings – REMOVED 2016
 Bird or animal deformities or reproduction problems – REMOVED 2017
 Loss of fish and wildlife habitat – REMOVED 2017

Remedial action plan

Remediation and restoration work 
The St. Clair River AOC includes the entire river, from the Blue Water Bridge at the north end, to the southern tip of Seaway Island, west to St. Johns Marsh and east to include the north shore of Mitchells Bay on Lake St. Clair. Anchor Bay is not included.

Through the Great Lakes Agreement, a Remedial Action Plan (RAP) was created to initiate cleanup measures. Its background report noted the adverse effects of pollution in the river and lakes:

 Restrictions on fish consumption
 Bird and animal deformities
 Degradation of benthos
 Restrictions on dredging activities
 Restrictions on drinking water consumption
 Beach closings
 Degradation of aesthetics
 Added cost to agriculture and industry
 Loss of fish and wildlife habitat

According to the Stage 1 Remedial Action Plan (RAP), the reasons for the Loss of Fish and Wildlife Habitat beneficial use impairment (BUI) in the St. Clair River were general loss of the aquatic plant community due to industrial, agricultural, recreational, and urban developments. A large blob of perchloroethylene was found at the bottom of the St Clair River due to runoff from Dow Chemical Corp in 1985. It remains there, slowly mixing with the water.

The RAP for the St. Clair River AOC was initiated in 1985. A bi-national group called the RAP Team, which included representatives from federal, state, and provincial governments of both Canada and the United States was established in 1987 to develop the plan and to ensure adequate and appropriate public involvement.

Erosion and Great Lakes drainage
Federal officials have long acknowledged that dredging and riverbed mining in the St. Clair dropped the long-term average of Great Lakes Huron and Michigan by about 16 inches. A bi-national Great Lakes water-level study concluded in 2013 that unexpected erosion since the last major St. Clair dredging project in the early 1960s has dropped the lakes' long-term average by an additional 3 to 5 inches. Today, these lakes are nearly 2 feet lower than before human modifications to the riverbed of the St. Clair River. This record low has raised concerns about the long-term health of the lakes. Activists urge remediation to slow the flow of waters through the St. Clair River and out of the lake system, to restore former water levels. However as of October 2020, the Lake Huron water is averaging 581.5 feet above sea level, which is considerably above the Datum of 577.5 feet, and above the Mean Long-Term Water Level of 578.8 feet.

Crossings
This is a list of bridges and other crossings of the St. Clair River from Lake St. Clair upstream to Lake Huron.

See also
List of rivers of Ontario
List of rivers of Michigan
Blue Water River Walk

References

External links

 

 
Great Lakes Waterway
Border rivers
Canada–United States border
International rivers of North America
Lake Huron
Lake St. Clair
Rivers of Chatham-Kent
Rivers of Lambton County
Rivers of Macomb County, Michigan
Rivers of St. Clair County, Michigan